Lamač is the smallest borough of Bratislava, the capital of Slovakia, lying in the northern part of the city. Part of the Bratislava IV district, Lamač is home to approximately 7,000 inhabitants. Until 1946, Lamač was a small independent village, but it was incorporated into the city Bratislava. In the past, Lamač was known for its vineyards and as an agricultural and fruit supplier for Bratislava's markets.

The dominant features of Lamač include the Church of Saint Margita, the Chapel of Saint Rozalia and the Memorial to soldiers killed in The First World War. Lamač is accessible by the public transport system of Bratislava. The borough also features the Bratislava Lamač railway station.

Location 
Lamač borders Dúbravka to the south-east, Devínska Nová Ves to the west, Záhorská Bystrica to the north and Rača to the east, separated by the Pezinok Carpathians.

Division 
Lamač is unofficially divided into two local parts: Rázsochy and Podháj.

History 
Present-day Lamač lies on the territory of four medieval villages. The first one (unknown name) ceased to exist in 1241. Blumenau and Sellendorf were founded between 1279 and 1288 and de facto ceased to exist until 1436, probably because of frequent border disputes and their division between the heirs of the original founder. Croats fleeing from the Ottomans in the south settled this area in the 16th century. Lamač was founded by a Croatian Jan (probably Skerlič). It was first mentioned as Krabatendorff (Croatian Village) in 1547 and two years later under its Slavic name Lamas (1549). The village suffered from several epidemics and military conflicts, it was burned, looted by anti-Ottoman armies (1604) and four times during the Rákóczi's War of Independence (1703–11). The final battle of the Austro-Prussian War took place on 22 July 1866 during which the Prussians again burned down the village. At the end of the 19th century, the village was mostly Slovak (93,3% in 1900). After the World War I, the village became a part of Czechoslovakia and on 1 April 1946 it became a borough of Bratislava.

Education 
Lamač features one public elementary school and kindergarten, MŠ and ZŠ Heyrovského Street and one private elementary school and kindergarten Súkromná základná škola s materskou školou Heyrovského 2 also at Heyrovského Street.

Sports 
Lamač features a swimming pool Kúpalisko Lamač at Pod násypom Street, a winter stadium Ice arena at Borinská Street containing ice hockey stadium and curling rink, soccer playing field Futbalové ihrisko FK Lamač at Na barine Street and a multi-purpose sports hall at Na barine Street.

See also 

 Boroughs and localities of Bratislava
 Geography of Bratislava
 History of Bratislava

Gallery

References

External links
 Lamač website 
 Zimný štadion Lamač website 

Boroughs of Bratislava
Villages in Slovakia merged with towns